Asociación Atlética Estudiantes (usually known as Estudiantes de Río Cuarto) is a sports club located in the city of Río Cuarto, Córdoba Province (Argentina). Although many sports are practised at the club, it is mostly known for its football team, which currently plays in the Primera Nacional, the 2nd level of the Argentine football league system.

First Division
Estudiantes played at the highest level of Argentine football on 3 consecutive occasions, having qualified to play the Campeonato Nacional in 1983, 1984 and 1985.

In 1983 Estudiantes was eliminated at the first stage failing to win a single game. Next year Estudiantes was eliminated at the first round stage by finishing 3rd in their group of 4 teams. The squad won its first game at the highest level and also achieved a draw against River Plate.

In 1985 Estudiantes finished 2nd in its group, qualifying to the next stage. During the group stage the team faced Boca Juniors, achieving a 1–1 tie in the first match, although the Xeneize then defeated Estudiantes 7–1 in the return fixture. In the 2nd stage Estudiantes would be finally eliminated by San Martín de Tucumán.

See also
List of football clubs in Argentina
Argentine football league system

External links
 
 Official website (archived, 27 Jan 2021)

Football clubs in Córdoba Province, Argentina
Association football clubs established in 1912
1912 establishments in Argentina